State Thomas is a Dallas Landmark District in the Uptown area of Dallas, Texas (USA). It borders downtown to the south at Woodall Rodgers Freeway, Bryan Place to the east at US 75 (Central Expressway), and LoMac to the north and west.

The State Thomas neighborhood contains the largest collection of Victorian-era homes remaining in Dallas including the Jacob and Eliza Spake House listed on the National Register of Historic Places. The establishment of the region as a Special Purpose District in 1986 helped make it one of the first new urbanist regions in the city.

Griggs Park
Griggs Park sits on the northeastern edge of State Thomas, where the neighborhood borders Woodall Rodgers Freeway. The pet-friendly park spans eight acres and features walking paths, benches, groves of trees, and views of both the downtown and uptown Dallas skylines. The park also features a memorial to the park's namesake, the Rev. A.R. Griggs, a 19th-century Baptist preacher and leader in the historic State Thomas and Freedman's community.

Gallery

References

Historic districts in Texas
Dallas Landmarks